The National Ballet of Canada is a Canadian ballet company that was founded in 1951 in Toronto, Ontario, with Celia Franca , the first artistic director. A company of 70 dancers with its own orchestra, the National Ballet has been led since 2022 by artistic director Hope Muir. Renowned for its diverse repertoire, the company performs traditional full-length classics, embraces contemporary work and encourages the creation of new ballets, as well as the development of Canadian dancers and choreographers.

The company's repertoire includes works by Sir Frederick Ashton, George Balanchine, John Cranko, Rudolf Nureyev, John Neumeier, William Forsythe, James Kudelka, Wayne McGregor, Alexei Ratmansky, Crystal Pite, Christopher Wheeldon, Aszure Barton, Guillaume Côté and Robert Binet. The National Ballet tours in Canada and internationally, with appearances in London, Paris, Hamburg, Moscow, St. Petersburg, New York City, Washington, D.C., Los Angeles, and San Francisco.

Creation of the National Ballet of Canada 
In 1951, the two major ballet companies in Canada were the Royal Winnipeg Ballet headed by Gweneth Lloyd, and the Volkoff Canadian Ballet founded by Boris Volkoff, which was based in Toronto. With the aim of creating a more widely based Canadian ballet troupe, following the example set by the Sadler's Wells Royal Ballet, a group of Canadian ballet enthusiasts set out to create the National Ballet of Canada.

English ballet enthusiasts Sheila Bloom, Rosemary Winckley and Patricia Barnes (née Winckley), who were living in Toronto at the time, were responsible for the initial fundraising, which enabled the company to attract its first dancers, choreographers and artistic director. Both Lloyd and Volkoff were interested in being the first artistic director of the company, but the organizers agreed that the only way to ensure an unbiased selection of dancers for the new ballet company was to hire an outsider. They chose British dancer and choreographer Celia Franca, who had many connections within the dance community and had been to Canada only twice at that point, as artistic director.

Franca at first showed little interest in heading this new company; she had refused similar invitations in Australia and South Africa and liked living in the United Kingdom. Nevertheless, when she came to Canada in 1951 to attend a festival, the founders again asked her to consider the position. Franca accepted the job and became the first artistic director, while Volkoff was appointed as Resident Choreographer. Conductor George Crum acted as Musical Director.

In August 1951, what was then The National Ballet Guild of Canada launched its first cross-country audition tour. By the end of the month, the ballet had chosen 29 dancers for the troupe and was rehearsing for their first performance in the St. Lawrence Hall.

For The National Ballet Guild of Canada's early performances, Franca chose classic ballets, as she believed this would allow the dancers to be properly judged by the international dance community. The first performance was in the Eaton Auditorium on November 12, 1951. The program included Les Sylphides and Polovtsian Dances from Prince Igor.

Development 
The company toured Canada extensively, with Franca, Lois Smith and David Adams as its stars. In 1964, the National Ballet adopted the 3200-seat O'Keefe Centre (now known as Meridian Hall) in Toronto as its home venue. The company moved in 2006 to new facilities at the Four Seasons Centre for the Performing Arts.

In 1976, Alexander Grant, former Principal Dancer with London's Royal Ballet and Artistic Director of Ballet for All, became the Artistic Director of the National Ballet. Under his leadership, the company added a number of works by Frederick Ashton to its repertoire. The National Ballet of Canada became the first Canadian company to perform at the Royal Opera House, Covent Garden, London in 1979.

In 1981 the company participated alongside Les Grands Ballets Canadiens, the Royal Winnipeg Ballet, le Groupe de la Place Royale, the Danny Grossman Dance Company, the Toronto Dance Theatre, Winnipeg Contemporary Dancers and the Anna Wyman Dance Theatre in the Canadian Dance Spectacular, a dance show at Ottawa's National Arts Centre which was filmed by the National Film Board of Canada for the 1982 documentary film Gala.

In 1989, Reid Anderson became the artistic director. He led the company through a difficult economic recession by choreographing traditional ballet pieces while also commissioning Canadian and international choreographers to create contemporary pieces. In 1995, he left the company citing a frustration of the continued funding cuts from the government, and the directorship was taken up in 1996 by choreographer James Kudelka.

In 2005, Karen Kain, former Principal Dancer, became Artistic Director of the company. In 2009, Innovation debuted, a mixed programme featuring three world premieres by Canadian choreographers Crystal Pite, Sabrina Matthews and Peter Quanz. In 2011, the company premiered a new version of Prokofiev's Romeo and Juliet by Alexei Ratmansky. The National Ballet of Canada remains Canada's largest and most influential dance company.

In June 2020, Kain stepped down from the company. The following month, it was announced that Hope Muir will succeed Kain, effective January 1, 2022.

Canada's National Ballet School 

The Canada's National Ballet School was founded in 1959 by Celia Franca and Julia Bondy and was directed for many years by co-founder Betty Oliphant. The primary goal of the school is to train dancers for the National Ballet of Canada and also for companies across Canada and around the world. Graduates of the School include Frank Augustyn, Neve Campbell, Anne Ditchburn, Rex Harrington, Karen Kain (former Artistic Director of the Company), James Kudelka (former Artistic Director of the Company), Veronica Tennant, Martine Lamy, John Alleyne, Emmanuel Sandhu, and Mavis Staines (Artistic Director and Co-CEO of the School).

International recognition 
Rudolf Nureyev danced with the company in 1965 and returned in 1972 to stage his version of The Sleeping Beauty. His work is credited to raising the standards of the company.  He was responsible for bringing the Company to Lincoln Center's Metropolitan Opera House in New York City where he showcased the company. The Ballet met with rave reviews and this was a pivotal point in receiving recognition internationally.  Karen Kain and Frank Augustyn, two members of NBC, received the prize for best pas de deux at the International Ballet Competition in Moscow in 1973.  The following year, in 1974, while on a tour in Canada, Mikhail Baryshnikov defected and requested political asylum in Toronto and joined the Royal Winnipeg Ballet.  His first televised performance after coming out of temporary seclusion in Canada was with the National Ballet of Canada in a version of La Sylphide. More recently the company co-produced Christopher Wheeldon’s The Winter’s Tale with The Royal Ballet in London. The New York Times’ Alastair MaCauley declared that he admired it more in The National Ballet of Canada’s performance than when he "saw the ballet’s first performances in London, principally because of Evan McKie’s eloquent interpretation of Leontes." Macaulay also highly praised Francesco Gabriele Frola, Svetlana Lunkina & Jurgita Dronina; all four dancers being Kain recruits. A duet between Hermione (Dronina) and Leontes (McKie) was "a particular breakthrough for Mr. Wheeldon" as well.

Dancers

Principal Dancers 

 
 Guillaume Côté
 Jurgita Dronina
 Naoya Ebe
 Koto Ishihara
 Harrison James
 Svetlana Lunkina
 Siphesihle November
 Heather Ogden
 Genevieve Penn Nabity
 Tina Pereira
 Ben Rudisin
 Piotr Stanczyk

Principal Character Artists 
  
 Stephanie Hutchison
 Etienne Lavigne
 Alejandra Perez-Gomez
 Jonathan Renna
 Rebekah Rimsay
 Hazaros Surmeyan

Prominent National Ballet dancers 
 
David Adams
Darren Anderson
Aleksandar Antonijevic
Irene Apinee
Frank Augustyn
Mikhail Baryshnikov
Victoria Bertram
Anne Ditchburn
Lorna Geddes
Kimberly Glasco
Chan Hon Goh
Jury Gotshalks
Rex Harrington
 Greta Hodgkinson
Vanessa Harwood
Yoko Ichino
Margaret Illmann
Mary Jago
Karen Kain
Zdenek Konvalina
Earl Kraul
Martine Lamy
Serge Lavoie
Yseult Lendvai
Elena Lobsanova
Teresa Mann
Evan McKie
David Nixon
Nadia Potts
Kevin Pugh
Jeremy Ransom
Sonia Rodriguez
Lois Smith
Raymond Smith
Veronica Tennant
Robert Tewsley
Martine van Hamel
Jillian Vanstone
Gizella Witkowsky

See also 
List of productions of Swan Lake derived from its 1895 revival

References

External links 

The National's Rex Harrington
The National's Karen Kain
Archival footage of the National Ballet of Canada performing Lilac Garden in 1953 at Jacob's Pillow
 National Ballet of Canada fonds (R3863) at Library and Archives Canada
National Ballet of Canada within Google Arts & Culture

 
Performing groups established in 1951
1951 establishments in Ontario